Brunfelsamidine is a poisonous pyrrolidine occurring in several species belonging to the Solanaceous (nightshade family) genus Brunfelsia, which has convulsant and neurotoxic effects. It is a fairly common cause of poisoning among domestic animals such as cows and dogs that eat the plant. Symptoms are similar to poisoning from strychnine and can last from a few hours up to several days. It is also a weak tryptase (type of serine protease) inhibitor and found in Leptonychia pubescens

References 

Convulsants
Plant toxins
Alkaloids found in Solanaceae
Amidines
Pyrroles